The First League of the Republika Srpska 2010–11 was the 16th since its establishment.

League table

External links 
 FSRS official website.

Bos
2010–11 in Bosnia and Herzegovina football
First League of the Republika Srpska seasons